Terradessus is a genus of beetles in the family Dytiscidae, containing the following species:

 Terradessus anophthalmus Brancucci & Monteith, 1997
 Terradessus caecus Watts, 1982

References

Dytiscidae